Nesopupa eapensis is a species of very small air-breathing land snail, a terrestrial pulmonate gastropod mollusk in the family Vertiginidae. This species is endemic to Palau.

References

Fauna of Palau
Vertiginidae
Endemic fauna of Palau
Gastropods described in 1880
Taxonomy articles created by Polbot